Abdul Mannan (died 6 February 2006) was a Bangladeshi religious leader and journalist who served as the Minister for Religious Affairs in the cabinet of Hussain Muhammad Ershad. He was a key collaborator of the Pakistani Army and was accused of war crimes during the Liberation war of Bangladesh.

Political career
Mannan was a general secretary of the Islamic Advisory Council and Regional Council during the administration of Ayub Khan.

Opposition to the independence of Bangladesh
On 29 September, under the leadership of Mannan, a group of the teachers of Madrasah met Amir Abdullah Khan Niazi. At that meeting, Mannan gave a copy of the Quran to general Niazi and stated that they are ready to support the Pakistan army to preserve the security of Pakistan and the glory of Islam.

Mannan was allegedly involved in the abduction and murder of physician AFM Alim Chowdhury.

After 1971
After independence, he became the president of the Jamiat-e- Mudarressin Bangladesh, an organisation of madrasah teachers and the founder of the Daily Inqilab, one of the country's highly circulated newspapers. In Saptahik Bichitra (a weekly magazine), Mannan denied that he had been a member of Peace committee and claimed that he had not issued any statement in favor of Pakistan Army and the genocide committed by them.

In 1979, he was elected a lawmaker from Chandpur and was appointed minister by President Hussain Muhammad Ershad's cabinet.

Trial and release
Hotel Intercontinental and Holy Family Hospital was declared neutral zones by the government on 11 December 1971. Mannan took shelter in one of these zones.

In a report released in March 1994, a People's Inquiry Commission, identified, in addition to Ghulam Azam, eight others as the collaborators of the Al-Badr in the atrocities. Mannan was one of those identified collaborators.

Shyamoli Nasrin Chowdhury, wife of the AFM Alim Chowdhury, alleges that Mannan was responsible for the death of her husband. She filed a case against Mannan. The absconding Mannan was caught by police from the Azimpur area of the city of Dhaka. Mannan confessed that three members of the Al-Badr who were his students took away AFM Alim Chowdhury.

Mannan was taken to the Dhaka Central Jail on 27 December. He was released for some unknown reason and went into hiding.

Death
Mannan died on 6 February 2006 at his Banani residence in Dhaka. His funeral was held at the Gausul Azam Mosque Complex in Mohakhali the next day where he was buried.

References

2006 deaths
People from Chandpur District
Religious affairs ministries of Bangladesh
2nd Jatiya Sangsad members
3rd Jatiya Sangsad members
4th Jatiya Sangsad members